Eve Christine Gadzikwa (née Mandaza) (born 24 December 1964) is a Zimbabwean businesswoman, leader, mentor, philanthropist, and an author. She is currently the Director General and Secretary to the Standards Association of Zimbabwe and the 13th President of AU standards body, the African Organisation for Standardisation (ARSO). Dr Gadzikwa is the past board chairperson of the Zimbabwe Stock Exchange and past Chairperson of The Institute of Directors (IoD) Zimbabwe.

Dr. Gadzikwa's career spans over 25 years in the public and private sectors. Eve was appointed to her current executive position as Director General of the Standards Association of Zimbabwe in September 2008. She is the organisation's Company Secretary and Governance Champion. Eve is an experienced medical laboratory scientist (microbiologist). Eve is currently the President and first female president  of African Organisation for Standardisation (a continental intergovernmental standardisation body under the African Union), headquartered in Nairobi, Kenya for 2016–2019.

Additionally, Dr. Gadzikwa is Fellow of the Institute of Medical Laboratory and Clinical Scientist Council of Zimbabwe; Fellow of Marketing Association of Zimbabwe; and Fellow of Chartered Institute Customer Management.

Early life and education 
Dr. Eve Christine Gadzikwa (née Mandaza), the third-born child of four (4) children of Joel and Grace Mandaza, was born on the eve of Christmas (December 24), 1964 at Marondera village in Zimbabwe; hence her first name is Eve. Her parents moved to Zambia, where her father worked as a miner in the Nchanga Copper Mines of Chingola and her mother was a registered mid-wife and nurse.

Dr. Gadzikwa attended her primary education at Hellen Waller School and early secondary schooling Fatima Girls High in Ndola, Zambia where she became a fluent speaker of the Bemba language. In 1978 at the age of 15 years while studying Form II she returned to Zimbabwe where she attended St Johns’ High, Emerald Hill a catholic boarding school. It is at St Johns’ High, Emerald Hill, where Eve studied biology.

She obtained a Marketing Management Diploma from the Institute of Marketing Management in South Africa (IMM SA).

In 2004 she embarked on and further graduated with Masters in Business Administration from the University of Nottingham (UK), to solidify her business knowledge.

Career and professional life 

In September 2008, she was appointed to her present position of Director General and Secretary to the Standards Association of Zimbabwe. Eve spent three (3) years as a consultant within the African region and visited countries such as Kenya, Namibia, Lesotho, Ghana and the US, where she spent her earlier professional career working with medical testing and public health laboratories. Prior to joining Standards Association of Zimbabwe (SAZ, 1 July 2015 (UTC)), she spent six (6) years at Zimbabwe National Quality Assurance (ZINQAP) Trust, a national Proficiency Testing organization where she was executive director.

She is the past chairperson for the Zimbabwe Stock Exchange (ZSE) board and Institute of Directors of Zimbabwe (IODZ); and leading the country's sole standards and quality assessment and certification organization – the Standards Association of Zimbabwe (SAZ).

Dr. Gadzikwa is the first woman in Zimbabwe to head the ZSE, IODZ and SAZ all at the same time.

Personal life 
Dr. Gadzikwa was married to Celestine Gadzikwa a Zimbabwean businessman with whom she has two children. She is currently undergoing a divorce process

Current Leadership Positions

Standards Association of Zimbabwe Director General
African Organisation for Standardisation President (June 2016-June 2019) 
BancABC Non-Executive Director
Board of Trustees Women's University in Africa
Slice Distributors Board Vice Chairman
Confederation of Zimbabwe Industries Committee Chair–Standards & Business Ethics
ISO DEVCO Chairman's Advisory Committee Member
Eve was Appointed to Gwanda University Council by former President of Zimbabwe RG Mugabe (2017)

Past Leadership Positions

Immediate Past Chair Institute of Directors Zimbabwe (2010-2015)
Immediate Past Chair Zimbabwe Stock Exchange (2010-2015)
Past SADCAS Board Member (2009-2015)
Past Executive Director ZINQAP Trust (Accredited Proficiency Testing Body)

Publications 
Author of “I Dare you to lead”

References

Zimbabwean philanthropists
Zimbabwean businesspeople
1964 births
Living people
Zimbabwean women in business